San Pietro di Morubio is a comune (municipality) in the Province of Verona in the Italian region Veneto, located about  west of Venice and about  southeast of Verona.

The municipality of San Pietro di Morubio contains the frazione (subdivision) Bonavicina.

San Pietro di Morubio borders the following municipalities: Angiari, Bovolone, Cerea, Isola Rizza, and Roverchiara.

Demographic evolution

References

Cities and towns in Veneto